The music of Namibia includes a number of folk styles, as well as pop, rock, reggae, jazz, house and hip hop.

The Sanlam-NBC Music Awards and the Namibian Music Awards are two separate institutions that give out annual awards at shows on December 2 and May 6 respectively. The Namibia Society of Composers and Authors of Music (NASCAM) has helped promote Namibian music within and outside the country.

The Namibian music industry remains under-developed, with no major record labels or distribution infrastructure. A lack of focus to produce economically viable Namibian music products and the absence of effective marketing and distribution structures are two of the factors inherently hampering the development of the local music industry.The country's online music retailer, DONLU offers streaming services.

Folk music
Traditional Namibian dances occur at events such as weddings and at traditional festivals such as the Caprivi Arts Festival. Folk music accompanies storytelling or dancing. The Nama people use various strings, flutes and drums while the Bantu use xylophones, gourds and horn trumpets.
 The Herero people's oviritje is popularly known as konsert. Otjiherero is the primary language of Oviritje music. Oviritje was made popular by Kareke Henguva as a pioneer of Modern Oviritje Music when he together with the likes of Kakazona Kavari, Meisie Henguva and Oomzulu Pietersen introduced the keyboard element as prior to the introduction of the keyboard Oviritje Music was performed with vocals only. Prior to Kareke people like Matuarari Kaakunga and Bella Kazongominja have developed the Oviritje genre. Today in recognition of his contribution to the Oviritje music Kareke Henguva has been accorded the title of doctor of modern Oviritje music. Other groups that took over from Henguva and made this music popular are The Wild Dogs from the Okakarara area with their hit song "Kaondeka", Okazera from the Omaheke Region, the first group to include a San-speaking member, Bullet ya Kaoko, based in Opuwo in the Kunene Region, Tuponda, Katja, Millenium, Kareke and the United Kingdom-based Oviritje queen Kakazona ua Kavari.
 Maǀgaisa, a dance music genre commonly known as Damara Punch, is performed by Stanley, ǃAubasen, Dixson and Damara Dikding. Phura Duwe is known to be the king of Ma/gaisa as he came up this genre of music then follows the likes of Raphael and Pele, Pule, Ruby and Riio.
Many female singers are entering the Ma/gaisa world yearly. The genre was derived from Damara traditional music and is mainly sung in Khoekhoegowab.
 Shambo, the traditional  dance music of the Oshiwambo-speaking people, derives its name from "Shambo Shakambode" - "music". In the late nineties Yoba Valombola blended existing Oshiwambo music widely popularised by folk guitarist Kwela, Kangwe Keenyala, Boetie Simon, Lexington and Meme Nanghili na Shima. Later Setson and the Mighty Dread Band combined these and other Namibian styles and this was the birth of Shambo shakambode music. Yoba based Shambo on a dominant guitar, a rhythm guitar, percussion and a heavy "talking" bassline. Themes range from love to war and history. Young Namibian musicians  contributed sampled tracks backed by a blend of house music and Kwaito. Prominent shambo musicians include Tunakie, Ama Daz Floor, Tate Kwela and D-Naff, also a gospel musician. Kwiku mixes shambo with Kwassa kwassa. The genre was made popular by Tate Buti and his sister Janice with Faizel MC on the song "Kwiku". It is listened to by most Namibians including Basters and Coloureds. In 2005 it was recognized by the Namibia Society of Composers and Authors of Music (NASCAM) as one of Namibia's folk music genres. The annual Sanlam-NBC Music Awards also included it as one of their awarding genres in 2005. Other kwiku artists include trio PDK, Olavi, Killa B, Castro, Faizel MC, Tunakie, and the late YT de Wet.
 Afrikaans music is also popular in Namibia. Afrikaans music primarily influenced by European folk music. In Namibia it is more popular among the white communities. Stefan Ludik is the most successful Afrikaans musician.

Popular music
Popular styles of music in Namibia include hip hop, R&B, Soul, reggae, afro-pop, house and kwaito. Upon Namibia's independence Jackson Kaujeua and Ras Sheehama had been the most outstanding Namibian performers. Kaujeua had been performing since the 1970s, he performed a mix of Namibia's traditional genres with afro-pop/gospel sounds. Sheehama performs reggae, in footsteps of reggae late legends Bob Marley and Lucky Dube. Sheehama has performed in Jamaica, Cuba, UK, Switzerland and the Czech Republic. Other early Namibian musicians includes a Setswana band called People's Choice, that was popular between 1996 and 1998 for their hit single "Don't Look Back (Siwelewele)", a kwaito trio called Matongo Family, Boli Mootseng, X-Plode with members (Jaicee James, Lizell Swarts & Christi Nomath Warner Warner Christi), oshiwambo indigenous rapper Shikololo and R&B turn-producer Big Ben. Big Ben has eventually become the most respected artist through his Afro pop and Fusion with his live shows. In fact he is one of the very few that performs all his shows with a live band while many still performs with back tracks. Namibian stars such as Stefan Ludik, The Dogg, Gazza, Gal Level, EES, Lady May, Sunny Boy and Big Ben have become continental celebrities as well as Placa Gang a group of hard working dream chasers.

Reggae/Dancehall/Afrobeats

The Namibian reggae platform has produced artist such as Ras Sheehama, Petu, Ngatu, who has been performing since 1994, Mighty Dreeds and EES. In the early eighties a band called We Culture was formed in Katutura and this turned to be Namibia's first reggae band. Another band followed called Roots rebels also based in the Katutura location. The Namibian independence came and most of the Namibian population that was in exile came back to Namibian and bands like Young Dreads later renamed as Mighty Dreads, Ras Sheehama, Los Amadeus, Omidi d Afrique, Shem Yetu, Organised Crime and 40Thieves. Most of these bands faded or became one and a group of young Namibian reggae musicians came up later. Most of the Mighty Dread band members left and formed Formular band or engage into solo careers. Dancehall, Ragga and Dub was gaining popularity and singers like Ngatu (from the Mighty Dread), Doren, Iron Roots, Ras Kasera and Ten-Dreadz came up with a new blend of Ragga Dancehall. EES is also respected in the R&B, hip hop and kwaito genres of Namibia. Buju Bantuan a.k.a. Katjoko (not to be confused with Jamaica's Buju Banton), the late La Chox and Kamasutra are one of the youngest reggae artist. Prominent kwaito artist Gazza has also associated himself with the genre as well as Killa-B

Rock n roll
Rock n roll is widely celebrated by the white communities of Namibia. Die Vögel is one of Namibia's most outstanding rock n roll bands. The band had success with the German-speaking Namibians during the 1970s. Stefan Ludik was Namibia's first Big Brother Africa participant in the show's first season. Today he is a successful rock n roll and pop musician and actor. His music is more popular among the Namibian and South African white communities. G3 a duo of two young Namibians gained success with their hit single "Olupandu" in 2005.
One of the country's most durable rock bands is Bedrock (The Band In The Sand). Formed in 1994 in Oranjemund, the band has released four albums of original material over the years: Recovery (2001), So, Where's The Party? (2003), Simplicity (2008) and Desert Rock (2010). They describe their sound as Desert Rock, an eclectic mix of styles from 1970s rock, blues, pop and folk. A feature of their compositions is the subtle thread of humour which underpins most of their work. The opening song of their debut album, Rock 'n' Roll, was voted by the South African Rock Digest as one of the Top 30 South African songs of 2003. It was also their first song to gain radio play. Despite numerous personnel changes over the years the band continues to thrive, playing regular gigs in and around Oranjemund.

Township Disco / Bubblegum
Is better known as Bubblegum Mapantshula Afro pop that's the rhythm who brings the legends like late Brenda Fassie and the Big Dudes, Chicco Twala, Dan Nkosi, Ebony, Richard Makhubale of Volcano, Dan Tsahnda of Splash, Yvonne Chaka Chaka, Alec OmKhali of Umoja. Gabkoz also is better known for such type of music in Namibia as well as Specco
, Scorpion, Ocean Girls, Mr. Tjiuti, Raindrops, Sonic Witness, The Couples, Right Choice, Manelo, and People Choice band, Erick Mahua, Rirua Murangi and Chicco of Chiccolela Production who have contributed much in these genre to produce many up and coming artists like Skilpad who got much interest in syth sound of the original tune of township keyboards instrument.

Namibian Hip Hop

Jericho Gawanab (born 21 May 1980), is a multiple award winning Namibian rapper, songwriter and entrepreneur. He is regarded as the most successful Hip Hop artist in the country. He won the coveted Best Male Artist at the Namibian Annual Music Awards (2011) becoming the first Hip Hop artist to do so. After establishing Ghetto Child, his own record label, he rose to fame with the release of his debut studio album, Check Who's Back (2006). Gawanab, professionally known as Jericho, continued his success by releasing studio albums which include: Lights Out (2007); Street Fame (2010); Let Me Be Me (2014) which features major South African rapper Cassper Nyovest and the legendary Hip Hop Pantsula; The Walls of Jericho (2016) and The Recovery (2020).

Hip hop music and culture have influenced Namibian youth, especially the American acts Tupac Shakur, The Notorious B.I.G., Nas, Jay-Z, Snoop Dogg, Dr. Dre and Eminem.

Early Namibian hip hop acts includes a group called Dungeon Family, which was composed of the newly recreated group The Kalaharians and the popular girl duo Gal Level. Other acts include Nakuni Heitah, Gurd Grill, OmPuff, Black Vulcanite and Mc Ray.

Namibian hip-hop can compete with kwaito for popularity.

R&B, pop, afro-pop
R&B has been popular in Namibia since the 1990s. Namibian R&B singers have influenced the genre with afro-pop. Most of them perform a mixture of pop/afro-pop and R&B. Afro-pop is the African style of wester-pop. The Namibian R&B/pop genre has produced continental celebrated duo Gal Level and solo singers African Boy, Sally Boss Madam, Christi Nomath Warner Warner Christi (who uses her poetry as basis for her lyrics) & Lady May. Te Quila, Jewelz and Sally Boss Madam are one of the most promising R&B/pop singers of Namibia. Male artist such as Rodger and Nasti are also popular they all show influence from Ne-Yo, Mario, and Chris Brown. Jossy Joss and Big Ben are one of the earliest singers of Namibia. Big Ben has been the most consistent with this genre since his first release in 2001.

Kwaito

The kwaito genre is the most popular and successful music genre in Namibia. It's believed to be the biggest industry in Namibia's music and the only that is heavily supported by the youth. This is so because of socio-economic issues, as many artists enter the music industry with hopes of strengthening self-employment and making a living out of it. Namibian kwaito has been strengthened and directly influenced by the South African kwaito style. However, over the years Namibia introduced a different type of kwaito, which makes it slightly different from the South African tradition. The difference lies in production; Namibian producers focus their production on party-oriented music.

Namibian kwaito artists include The Dogg, Gazza, Sunny Boy, Qonja, Tre Van Die Kasie, and OmPuff. The Dogg's debut album, Shimaliw' Osatana, was the first kwaito album released in Namibia by a Namibian artist.

House

House music is played at raves in Africa, especially South Africa. African house is based on African traditional melodies. It is characterized by a fast moving beat with thin melodies and synthesizers. Sometimes it is accompanied by vocals.

Metal
Since the late 1990s some artists perform heavy metal in Namibia, among those the Arcana XXII, subMission, Delusion Of Grandeur.
In 2007 the first Namibian festival took place with bands like CfD (USA), subMission (Namibia), Wrust (Botswana), Neblina (Angola), Delusion Of Grandeur (Namibia), followed by two other editions in 2008 and 2009 including artists like Lady Axe (South Africa), Juggernaught (South Africa), Azrail (South Africa).

Electronic music
In the late nineties an ex Mighty Dread singer (Yoba Valombola, known as Benga), bassist and guitarist came back from Germany with a big influence and eager in change and started an independent label called Big Rat Communication. This was fuelled by the idea of producing Namibia's first electronic music ranging from, Trip hop, Drum and bass, Dubstep and drumstep. Due to the unpopularity of  electronic music in Namibia, Yoba released his music only in Europe and America under the name Benga. Most of the electronic music Benga release is based on his early experiments of Reggae, Shambo, blues and rock. Yoba went back to the west and returned again after six years to Namibia to influence other Namibians. Some existing experimental artists like Thomas Swarts, Dtubsen and Joas tried forming a group and due to time and obligations, nothing worked out. Yoba is still based in Germany as an electronic artist and performing with other Namibian artists in Europe: widely as Canada and South America.

Record labels
Notable Namibian record labels include:
 Mshasho Productions
 Gazza Music Productions
 Yaziza Entertainment

See also
 List of Afrikaans singers

References

  
  
  
  
 "DONLU A Digital Hub for Namibian Music.

Further reading

External links 
 Audio clips - traditional music of Namibia. French National Library. Accessed November 25, 2010